Jamala al-Baidhani (1977-December 15, 2012) was a Yemeni activist who supported civil rights for women and the disabled. She is the founder of the Al-Tahadi Association for Disabled Females, the first group in Yemen devoted to helping girls with disabilities.

Biography 
Al-Baidhani was born in Al Aeoff village in the Al Baidha region. She was an active child until she contracted meningitis at age seven and became paralyzed because of complications related to the illness. After she recovered, Al-Baidhani used a wheelchair to get around. In 1995, she started working in the Ministry of Social Affairs and also started going to college. She received a bachelor's degree in social sciences.

Al-Baidhani started working with disability rights in the government of Yemen in 1996, but later felt that she wasn't able to reach her goal of bringing services to disabled women working in the government. In Yemen, most people who have disabilities must rely on Disabled Persons Organizations (DPO) and  Non-Governmental Organizations (NGO). Al-Baidhani founded the Al-Tahadi as a DPO in 1998. Al-Baidhani later founded the Alesrar NGO for Youth Development which helps coordinate volunteerism for those with disabilities in 2006.

In 2007, the U.S. Embassy to Yemen honored her as a "Woman of Courage." In 2008, the Kuwaiti Embassy in Sana'a awarded Al-Baldhani $30,000 for her NGO work.

In 2012, Al-Baidhani died in Sana'a from complications from a respiratory disease. She was buried in the Majel Al-Dema Cemetery. Al-Baidhani was awarded the second Balquis Award posthumously in 2013. The award honors women who have made an "exceptional contribution to the development of Yemeni women."

References

External links 
 Jamalah Saleh Al Baidani (in Arabic and English)

1977 births
2012 deaths
Yemeni human rights activists
Yemeni people with disabilities
Yemeni women's rights activists
Yemeni disability rights activists
21st-century Yemeni women
21st-century Yemeni people